Hallam Peak is a distinctive rock peak in the Kukri Hills of Victoria Land, Antarctica. It was named by the Advisory Committee on Antarctic Names in 1997 after Dr. Cheryl A. Hallam, a geographer with the United States Geological Survey who specialized in geographic information systems, and who worked four summer seasons in Antarctica, 1994–95, 1995–96, 1996–97 and 1999–00.

References

Mountains of Victoria Land
McMurdo Dry Valleys